The carbon button lamp is a single-electrode incandescent lamp invented by Nikola Tesla.  A carbon button lamp contains a small carbon sphere positioned in the center of an evacuated glass bulb.  This type of lamp must be driven by high-frequency alternating current, and depends on an electric arc or perhaps a vacuum arc to produce high current around the carbon electrode.  The carbon electrode is then heated to incandescence by collisions by ions, which constitute the electric current.  Tesla found that these lamps could be used as powerful sources of ionizing radiation.

In February 1892, Tesla gave a lecture to the Institution of Electrical Engineers, in which he described the carbon button lamp in detail.  He also described several variants of the lamp, one of which uses a ruby drop in place of the carbon button.

See also 
 List of light sources

External links 
 Experiments with Alternate Currents of High Potential and High Frequency  - Tesla's lecture to the Institute of Electrical Engineers

Types of lamp